A high-protein diet is a diet in which 20% or more of the total daily calories comes from protein. Most high protein diets are high in saturated fat and severely restrict intake of carbohydrates.

Example foods in a high-protein diet include lean beef, chicken or poultry, pork, salmon and tuna, eggs, and soy. High-protein diets have been criticized as a type of fad diet and for promoting misconceptions about carbohydrates, insulin resistance and ketosis.

Health effects 

A 2011 review concluded that a "long-term effect of high-protein diets is neither consistent nor conclusive." A 2014 review noted that high-protein diets from animal sources should be handled with caution. High-protein diets can increase levels of ketones in the blood (ketosis) which may lead to high levels of uric acid, a risk factor for gout and kidney stones. High protein intake on the order of 200 g per day, coupled with inadequate intake of other calorie sources (fat or carbohydrates), can cause a form of metabolic disturbance and death commonly known as protein poisoning. Even when consuming other calorie sources, consuming more than 285 g of protein per day (for an 80 kg person) may be unsafe. 

A 2017 review indicated that a high-protein diet may contribute to life-long risk of kidney damage, including chronic kidney disease. Although this was disputed in a different review, a year later. High-protein diets may increase the risk of coronary artery disease, cancer and osteoporosis. Vitamin B deficiencies can develop if the diet is followed chronically, and negative effects associated with the diet may include bad breath, constipation, fatigue, and nausea. A 2020 review found that a high-protein diet does not significantly improve blood pressure and glycemic control in people with diabetes.

Sports training
While elevated amounts of protein consumption are beneficial during athletic training, particularly when attempting to gain muscular mass and strength, there is little evidence of any benefit from increasing protein intake above 2 g/kg bodyweight/day.

Criticism

In 2001, the American Heart Association’s Nutrition Committee issued a strong recommendation against high-protein diets such as Protein Power and the Atkins diet. The committee noted potential health risks of high-protein diets and how there are no long-term scientific studies to support their efficacy and safety. 

The following high-protein diets have been criticized as fad diets:

Atkins diet
Dukan Diet
Montignac diet
Protein Power
Scarsdale diet
Stillman diet
Sugar Busters!
Zone diet

See also

 List of foods by protein content
 Bodybuilding supplement
 Dietary supplement
 Human nutrition
 List of diets
 Low-protein diet
 Nutrition

References

Further reading

Kamyar Kalantar-Zadeh, Holly M. Kramer, Denis Fouque. (2019). High-protein diet is bad for kidney health: unleashing the taboo. Nephrology Dialysis Transplantation gfz216. 

Diets
Fad diets
Proteins as nutrients